Gisella Giovenco (born Ferrara, 30 January 1946) is an Italian painter, stylist and publicist.

Biography 

Gisella Giovenco was born in 1946 in Ferrara: her father, Onofrio, was a Sicilian doctor from Alcamo, while her mother, Afra Mariani, was originary from Ferrara; she has been living at Bogliasco (Genova) since 1948; she attended the Liceo Artistico Nicolò Barabino in Genoa and had the painters Bassano and Alberto Nobile, and the sculptor Valdieri Pestelli as teachers.

She started painting in 1965, taking part in extemporaneous and collective exhibitions in Italy, France, Venezuela and USA; since 1968 she has almost exclusively set personal exhibitions in Genoa, Milan, Bergamo, Agrigento, Tokio, Osaka, Hiroshima, Hakata.

In 1979 she is quoted in the "Bolaffi" Catalogue, and in 1980 met Tito Fontana, a composer who wanted to put some painted landscapes to music; so in 1981 they realized the art show "Sounds and colours" at the Galleria Cortina in Milan, where Tito Fontana composed a piece for each painting: all of them with a soundtrack, music, and light synchronized on the work inside the gallery in the dark: painting and music together, telling the same emotions.

Gisella Giovenco realizes different covers of jazz Lps for "Studio 7" and DIRE and collaborates in the realization of the pieces that Fontana composes to set Pope John Paul II’s poems to music which, after Sarah Vaughan’s concert held in Düsseldorf, becomes an LP.

In the 1990s, she was a victim of chronic fatigue syndrome, after getting through the first stage of this disease but not in a perfect form yet, she can devote herself to painting, but as she keeps a dog and a cat at home and the oil canvases, leaning everywhere, are drying very slowly, in order to avoid any imaginable inconveniences, she invents a new personal technique by using the silk cuttings of the remainings from the creation of some of her fashion collections.

So, what Vittorio Sgarbi will define cloth intarsias in his presentation of the volume "Omaggio alla Cristianita’ ", were born: a very detailed work looking for, among thousands of remnants, the desired shape and the right hue: the distinctive characteristics of silk give the possibility of getting some shades, variegations and chromatic reflections really original and unique in their kind. At Portofino she successfully tries out the first paintings with her technique, and in 2000 exhibits some 30 of them at Spazio San Carpoforo in Milan.

The subjects represented by Gisella Giovenco, the churches’ façades, are as original as their realization: a mosaic placed on a background painted in a uniform way, enriched by shiny silk pieces which highlight the preciousness of capitals and decorations, and produce an exceptional chromatic effect, very realistic but also different from photography.

As her source of inspiration, Giovenco selects the subjects and images coming from the Holy Tradition and Christianity, that she considers authentic masterpieces and inestimable values of the Italian cultural patrimony, with the aim of enhancing them, making them as the absolute protagonists of her creations. According to the artist, only if you are aware of the importance of your own culture, you can respect and understand the others.

In 2005, in the parish Church of Bogliasco, with the collaboration of the Confraternity of Santa Chiara and the patronage of the municipality of Bogliasco, the artist exhibited some 40 of her paintings (both oil and intarsias), giving the proceeds of them to a cultural iniziative which was a matter of concern for many fellow citizens: the restoration of the façade of the ancient Oratory of Santa Chiara; the title given to this exhibition was 40 chiese per Santa Chiara (that is:forty churches for Santa Chiara).

In 2009 she collected part of the 150 façades of the churches she had already ‘’painted’’ in a book, entitled Omaggio alla Cristianità: the presentation was written by Vittorio Sgarbi and the preface by cardinal Angelo Bagnasco.

In 2011, with the technique of Trompe-l'œil, she painted three walls of the hall of the parish Church of Bogliasco and, with the same technique, the four sails of the ceiling of the veranda in Villa Crovetto (a senior home) in the district of San Bernardo in 2012.

Finally, in December 2017, Gisella Giovenco decided to donate seven of her works to Alcamo, the hometown of his father, doctor Onofrio Giovenco, a pediatrician who practised his profession in Liguria, achieving notoriety for his scientific discoveries that were also published on international reviews, and for his long fight in favour of the reintegration of the yacht Elettra which belonged to Guglielmo Marconi.

Stylist
In 1983 she creates some collections of men’s leatherware and designs women’s handbags; between 1991 and 1992 she produces some collections of women’s fashion. Then Giovenco works together with Sergio Soldano’s atelier for the brand management, approaching the world of perfumes: three years later the result is a patent for the realization of perfumes personalized inside the shops at the time of sale, which was to be followed by a line of cosmetology personalized too; unfortunately the commercialization was suddenly stopped owing to her disease: chronic fatigue syndrome.

Activity as a publicist 
In 1979 she met Renzo Cortina, the famous gallerist and bookseller from Milan who entrusted her with the live conduction of L’angolo del libro at Antennatre. Among some 30 of her guests she reminds Gina Lagorio, Nantas Salvalaggio, Giulio Bedeschi, Carlo Castellaneta, Alberto Lattuada, Romano Battaglia, Alberto Bertuzzi, Alberto Bevilacqua, Renato Pozzetto, Luciano Sechi and Paolo Mosca. In the ‘80s she starts working for Il Giornale Nuovo in the fashion advertorials. Besides Indro Montanelli she meets Gianni Granzotto, Cesare Biazzi Vergani, Marcello Staglieno who let her feel at home. She also collaborates with the editorial board in Genoa.

In 1987 Giovenco writes a series of interviews to famous personalities which is entitled Com’erano da piccoli -Infanzia e adolescenza di persone conosciute -.(How they were when children- infancy and adolescence of people known) Paolo Villaggio, Ornella Vanoni, Giorgio Soavi, Arnaldo Pomodoro, Gino Paoli, Ottavio Missoni, Bruno Lauzi, Ugo Gregoretti, Mino Damato, Walter Chiari, Carlo Castellaneta, Gianni Baget Bozzo, Enzo Biagi Alberto Bertuzzi, Pippo Baudo, Enrico Baj. 
It will become a book published by Rebellato in 1993.[1] In April 1994 she took part in the television programme Maurizio Costanzo Show, where she presented her book.

Exhibitions 
 1967: Collective at the galleria "Chiesa di S. Romano" in Ferrara.
 1969: Galleria "Il Cigno" at via Manzoni in Milan (presented by Mario Lepore).  
 1972: "Galleria Guidi" in Genoa.
 1973: invited to take part, with 10 works, in the exhibition of Istituto Italiano di Cultura of Tokyo, held in Tokyo, Osaka, Hiroshima, Hakata.
 1976: Palazzo Comunale of Sperlonga;  
 1976: 1° Premio "Foemina", Genova;
 1976: invited by Circolo Sannitico, at Palazzo della Prefettura in Campobasso; 
 1976: "Galleria Tasso" in Bergamo (personal).
 1977: collective at Palazzo Comunale in Sperlonga;
 1979: con "Les artists d’Italie" in Parigi;  
 1979: personal at Galleria "La Polena" at Forte dei Marmi; 
 1979: 10 works at Galleria "Eastern Star" di Agrigento; 
 1979: 10 works at Palazzo Bonaiuto in Caltagirone. 
 1979: Galleria "La Polena" at Forte dei Marmi. 
 1980: Rossana Bewik prepares an exhibition for her in Canada, in Montreal. 
 1981: Galleria Cortina di Milano, Suoni e colori in collaboration with Tito Fontana
At Portofino she successfully tries out the first paintings with her technique.
 2000: Spazio San Carpoforo in Milano, she exhibits some 30 works created with silk intarsias 
 2012: Biennale Torinese, extension of the 54th Venice Biennale curated by Professor Vittorio Sgarbi, at Sala Nervi in Turin. She exhibited a work dedicated to Pope John Paul II.
 2012: Intarsi d’arte, at Milano Art Gallery Spazio Culturale in Milan

Publications 
 Com'erano da piccoli - infanzia e adolescenza di persone conosciute; San Donà di Piave: Rebellato Ed., 1993
 Suoni e Colori, ed.Direarte, Milano, 1981.
A particular edition where music and painting are linked; an Italian jazz trio with Sante Palumbo and Tito Fontana at the piano and Luigi Tognoli at the sax tenor.
The cover design is realized by Gisella Giovenco; the cover can be opened and contains 16 drawings made by Giovenco and photographated by Franco Bottino, the list of the pieces, each one corresponding to one of the artist's paintings.
 Omaggio alla Cristianità; with the presentation by Vittorio Sgarbi and the preface by Cardinal Angelo Bagnasco; publisher: IL CITTADINO

See also
 Museum of Contemporary Art of Alcamo
 Vittorio Sgarbi
 Angelo Bagnasco

References

Sources
 Alcamo-Pittrice dona sette quadri di chiese alla città
 Biografia. Gisella Giovenco
 Intervista a Gisella Giovenco, in occasione della mostra personale
 Un mosaico di stoffa per le chiese
 Le opere esposte
 Archived copy 
 Maurizio Costanzo show

External links 

 Comune Alcome
 Gisella Giovenco – Intarsi d’arte
 Gisella Giovenco
 Giovedì 29 Novembre, alle ore 18.30, la poliedrica Gisella Giovenco, inaugura la sua mostra personale "Intarsi d'arte" presso la "Milano Art Gallery Spazio Culturale" in Via Alessi 11, a Milano

1946 births
Living people
20th-century Italian journalists
Italian women journalists
20th-century Italian painters
20th-century Italian women artists
Italian fashion designers
Italian women fashion designers
Italian women painters
Artists from Ferrara